Mustapha Amari (born February 25, 1994) is a German footballer who plays as a midfielder for VfL Halle.

Career

Amari signed for Hallescher FC in 2012, having been in Erzgebirge Aue's youth team and made his 3. Liga debut in December 2013, as a substitute for Anton Müller in a 1–0 defeat to Wacker Burghausen.

References

External links

1994 births
Living people
German footballers
German people of Algerian descent
German sportspeople of African descent
Hallescher FC players
3. Liga players

Association football midfielders